Eidi Mordeh may refer to:
 Eidi Mordeh-ye Bala
 Eidi Mordeh-ye Pain